The Missa in honorem Sanctissimae Trinitatis in C major, K. 167, is a mass composed by Wolfgang Amadeus Mozart in June 1773. It is scored for SATB choir, violin I and II, 2 oboes, 2 clarini (high trumpets), 2 trumpets, timpani and basso continuo.

A solemn mass, its name ("in honour of the Most Holy Trinity") and date indicate that it was likely to have been composed for Trinity Sunday, for use in Salzburg's  (Trinity Church). This is Mozart's only wholly choral mass setting, excluding all solo vocalists. Einstein contends that this may have been done in order to achieve brevity, following the directive of Archbishop Colloredo.

The work consists of six movements. Performances take 25–30 minutes.

 Kyrie Allegro, C major, 
 Gloria Allegro, C major, 
Credo Allegro, C major, 
 "Et incarnatus est" Adagio, C major, 
 "Et resurrexit" Allegro, C major, 
 "Et in Spiritum Sanctum" Allegro, G major, 
 "Et unam sanctam" Allegro, C major, 
 "Et vitam venturi saeculi" Alla breve, C major, 
 Sanctus Andante, C major, 
 "Hosanna in excelsis" Allegro, C major, 
 Benedictus Allegro, F major, 
 "Hosanna in excelsis" Allegro, C major, 
 Agnus Dei Adagio, C major, 
 "Dona nobis pacem" Allegro moderato, C major,

References

External links

Masses by Wolfgang Amadeus Mozart
1773 compositions
Compositions in C major